Akdoğan is a Turkish word meaning "gyrfalcon" and may refer to:

People
 Necla Akdoğan (born 1971), Turkish women's footballer, referee and manager
 Onur Akdoğan (born 1994), Turkish-German footballer
 Yalçın Akdoğan (born 1969), Turkish politician and former government minister
 Yildiz Akdogan (born 1973), Turkish-Danish politician

Places
 Akdoğan, Devrekani, a village in Turkey
 Akdoğan, Kahta, a village in Turkey
 Akdoğan, Kastamonu, a village in Turkey
 Akdoğan, Kızılcahamam, a village in Turkey
 Akdoğan, Kızıltepe, a village in Turkey
 Akdoğan, Taşköprü, a village in Turkey
 Lysi, a village in Cyprus, whose Turkish name is Akdoğan
 Lake Akdoğan, a lake in Varto district of Muş Province, Turkey